is a Japanese rugby union player who plays as a flanker. He currently plays for Kubota Spears Funabashi Tokyo Bay in Japan's domestic Japan Rugby League One.

International
Makisi was called for his country on 25 October 2021 for the 2021 end-of-year rugby union internationals, having previously played two matches for Japan in 2019 and represented Junior Japan.

References

External Links
itsrugby.co.uk Profile

1997 births
Living people
Japanese rugby union players
Rugby union flankers
Kubota Spears Funabashi Tokyo Bay players